Mangotsfield School is a secondary school located in Mangotsfield in South Gloucestershire, north of the Kingswood suburb of Bristol.

History
The school was formed in 1982 after a merger of two pre-existing schools; Rodway School (originally Rodway Technical High School) was established in 1957 and located at the current Mangotsfield School site opposite Rodway Common, and the Chase School for Boys was located in Cossham Street and was established in about 1966. The Cossham Street and Rodway sites provided the lower and upper school sites for Mangotsfield School respectively. The Cossham Street site was demolished in 1996 to make way for the Emersons Green housing estate. At this time, the whole school was moved to the enlarged Rodway site.

Previously a community school administered by South Gloucestershire Council, Mangotsfield School converted to academy status in September 2015 sponsored by Castle School Educational Trust. However the school continues to coordinate with South Gloucestershire Council for admissions.

Structure
The school operates within five blocks:
A Block: ICT, Business and Humanities.
B Block: Art, Drama, P.E and Music
C Block: maths, English and MFL 
D Block: Science
E Block: Design Technology

The school also has a Student Centre, Dining Hall, drama and PE Sports Hall. It is complemented by  an astro pitch and tennis courts  (Rodway Hill Tennis Centre).

Alumni

Rodway Technical High School
 Tim Brain - Chief Constable of Gloucestershire

Rodway School
 Sara Dallin and Keren Woodward of Bananarama
 Australian celebrity chef James Reeson – chase school for boys
 John Hegley, performance poet
 Phil Kite, goalkeeper for Bristol Rovers
 Dave Kirby, general legend

Former teachers
 Malcolm Arnold (athletics coach) (1964–68), became Head Coach of UK Athletics from 1994 to 1997
 David Parsons (councillor) CBE (science teacher in the 1980s), former president from 1975 to 1976 of Oxford University Student Union, and Conservative Leader from 2003 to 2012 of Leicestershire County Council

References

Further reading
 The History Of Mangotsfield School by R. S. Howlett, published by Downend Local History Society, 1980 ASIN B0043DD24G

Secondary schools in South Gloucestershire District
Educational institutions established in 1982
1982 establishments in England
Academies in South Gloucestershire District